Lancing may refer to:

Lancing (surgical procedure)
Lancing (shearing), a manufacturing procedure
Lancing, West Sussex, England, a village
Lancing (electoral division), a West Sussex County Council constituency 
Lancing College, a boarding school near the village
Lancing railway station, serving the village
Lancing Carriage Works, a defunct railway site in the village

See also
 Lance (disambiguation)
 Lansing (disambiguation)